Crambus bidens, or Biden's grass-veneer, is a moth in the family Crambidae. It was described by Philipp Christoph Zeller in 1872. It is found in North America, where it has been recorded from Massachusetts, New York, Ontario, New Jersey, Quebec, Michigan and Alberta. The habitat consists of bogs.

References

Crambini
Moths described in 1872
Moths of North America